Sir William Geary, 2nd Baronet (23 September 1756 – 6 August 1825) was an English Tory politician from West Peckham in Kent. He sat in the House of Commons from 1796 to 1806 and from 1812 to 1818.

He was the eldest surviving son of Admiral Sir Francis Geary, 1st Baronet of Polesden, Surrey and was educated at Cheam School and Magdalen College, Oxford (1773-6). He succeeded his father in 1796 after his elder brother Francis had been killed in the American War of Independence. He lived at Oxon Hoath in West Peckham.

Geary was elected at the 1796 general election as one of the two Members of Parliament (MPs) for Kent. He was re-elected in 1802,
but was defeated at the 1806 general election. He did no contest the seat in 1807, but was re-elected at the 1812 general election. He held the seat until 1818, when he was defeated at the general election.

He was a Director of Greenwich Hospital, London from 1801 until his death in 1825.

He had married Henrietta, the daughter and coheiress of Richard Nevill, MP of Furnace, co. Kildare and the widow of Edward Dering, with whom he had 2 sons. He was succeeded by his eldest son Sir William Richard Powlett Geary, 3rd Baronet

References

External links 

1756 births
1825 deaths
People from West Peckham
People educated at Cheam School
Alumni of Magdalen College, Oxford
Tory MPs (pre-1834)
Members of the Parliament of Great Britain for English constituencies
British MPs 1796–1800
Members of the Parliament of the United Kingdom for English constituencies
UK MPs 1801–1802
UK MPs 1802–1806
UK MPs 1812–1818
Baronets in the Baronetage of Great Britain